Gabriel Steven (born 15 August 1994 in Lagos) is a Nigerian footballer who currently plays for Kastrioti Krujë in the Albanian First Division.

References

1994 births
Residents of Lagos
Nigerian footballers
Nigerian expatriate footballers
Expatriate footballers in Albania
Nigerian expatriate sportspeople in Albania
Association football midfielders
Living people
KS Kastrioti players
KS Burreli players
Kategoria e Parë players